The World Deaf Athletics Championships is a quadrennial global competitions in the sport of athletics for deaf people. It is organised by the International Committee of Sports for the Deaf and was first held in 2008.

Editions

Outdoor

Indoor

Medals

See also
 European Deaf Athletics Championships
 Asian Deaf Athletics Championships

Notes 
The 2021 World Deaf Athletics Championships was originally scheduled from 18 to 25 July 2020 and was going to be held in Radom, but was postponed due to the COVID-19 pandemic and moved to Lublin.

References

Deaf
Deaf sports competitions
Recurring sporting events established in 2008
Quadrennial sporting events
Para-athletics competitions